Clathrina passionensis is a species of calcareous sponge from Clipperton Island.

References
World Register of Marine Species entry

Clathrina
Animals described in 2011
Invertebrates of Clipperton Island
Taxa named by Rob van Soest